Diminovula mozambiquensis is a species of sea snails, a marine gastropod mollusc in the family Ovulidae, the ovulids, cowry allies or false cowries.

References

Ovulidae
Gastropods described in 2001